The enzyme phosphoenol pyruvate phosphatase (EC 3.1.3.60) catalyzes the reaction

phosphoenolpyruvate + H2O  pyruvate + phosphate

This enzyme belongs to the family of hydrolases, specifically those acting on phosphoric monoester bonds.  The systematic name of this enzyme class is phosphoenolpyruvate phosphohydrolase. This enzyme is also called PEP phosphatase.

References

 
 
 

EC 3.1.3
Enzymes of unknown structure